Croatia participated in the Eurovision Song Contest 2007 with the song "Vjerujem u ljubav" written by Dado Topić. The song was performed by the band Dragonfly featuring Dado Topić. The Croatian broadcaster Croatian Radiotelevision (HRT) organised the national final Dora 2007 to select the Croatian entry for the 2007 contest in Helsinki, Finland. Thirty-two entries competed in the national final which consisted of three shows: two semi-finals and a final. Eight entries qualified from each semi-final on 1 and 2 March 2007 to compete in the final on 3 March 2007. In the final, "Vjerujem u ljubav" performed by Dragonfly featuring Dado Topić was selected as the winner following the combination of votes from a five-member jury panel and a public televote.

Croatia competed in the semi-final of the Eurovision Song Contest which took place on 10 May 2007. Performing during the show in position 13, "Vjerujem u ljubav" was not announced among the top 10 entries of the semi-final and therefore did not qualify to compete in the final. This marked the first time that Croatia failed to qualify to the final of the Eurovision Song Contest from a semi-final since the introduction of semi-finals in 2004. It was later revealed that Croatia placed sixteenth out of the 28 participating countries in the semi-final with 54 points.

Background 

The nation's best result in the contest was fourth, which it achieved on two occasions: in 1996 with the song "Sveta ljubav" performed by Maja Blagdan and in 1999 with the song "Marija Magdalena" performed by Doris Dragović. In 2006, Croatia was an automatic finalist with Severina and the song "Moja štikla".

The Croatian national broadcaster, Croatian Radiotelevision (HRT), broadcasts the event within Croatia and organises the selection process for the nation's entry. HRT confirmed Croatia's participation in the 2007 Eurovision Song Contest on 31 October 2006. Since 1993, HRT organised the national final Dora in order to select the Croatian entry for the Eurovision Song Contest, a method that was continued for their 2007 participation.

Before Eurovision

Dora 2007 
Dora 2007 was the fifteenth edition of the Croatian national selection Dora which selected Croatia's entry for the Eurovision Song Contest 2007. The competition consisted of two semi-finals on 1 and 2 March 2007 and a final on 3 March 2007, all taking place at the Hotel Kvarner in Opatija and broadcast on HTV 1.

Format 
Thirty-two songs competed in Dora 2007 which consisted of three shows: two semi-finals and a final. Sixteen songs competed in each semi-final with the top eight proceeding to complete the sixteen-song lineup in the final. The results of all shows were determined by public televoting and the votes from a jury panel. The ranking developed by both streams of voting was converted to points from 1 (lowest) to 16 (highest) and assigned to the competing songs. Ties were decided in favour of the entry that received the most points from the jury.

The jury that voted in all three shows consisted of:

 Silvije Glojnarić – HRT
 Željen Klašterka – HTV
 Aleksandar Kostadinov – HTV
 Ljiljana Vinković – HTV
 Robert Urlić – HR

Competing entries 
On 30 November 2006, HRT opened a submission period where artists and composers were able to submit their interest in participating in the competition by 8 December 2006 and submit their entries to the broadcaster with the deadline on 8 January 2007. 100 entries were received by the broadcaster during the submission period. A five-member expert committee consisting of Silvije Glojnarić (HRT), Robert Urlić (HR), Ljiljana Vinković (HTV), Željen Klašterka (HTV) and Aleksandar Kostadinov (HTV) reviewed the received submissions and selected thirty-two artists and songs for the competition. HRT announced the competing entries on 23 January 2007 and among the artists were Goran Karan who represented Croatia in the Eurovision Song Contest 2000, Claudia Beni who represented Croatia in the Eurovision Song Contest 2003 and Feminnem who represented Bosnia and Herzegovina in the Eurovision Song Contest 2005. On 27 January 2007, Barbara Munjas replaced Claudia Beni as the performer of the song "Ti si tu". On 29 January 2007, Giuliano replaced Goran Karan as the performer of the song "Pismom te ljubi milijun mandolina". On 10, 17 and 24 February 2007, the competing artists performed their entries live during the preview programme Ususret dori broadcast on HRT 1.

Shows

Semi-finals 
The two semi-finals took place on 1 and 2 March 2007. The first semi-final was hosted by Duško Ćurlić, Mirko Fodor and Iva Šulentić, while the second semi-final was hosted by Duško Ćurlić, Mirko Fodor and Barbara Štrbac; Nikolina Pišek hosted segments from the green room in the first semi-final, while Iva Jerković hosted segments from the green room in the second semi-final. The eight qualifiers for the final from each semi-final were determined by a 50/50 combination of votes from a five-member jury panel and a public televote. 

In addition to the performances of the competing entries, 2005 Croatian Eurovision entrant Boris Novković performed as the interval act during the first semi-final, while 2001 Croatian Eurovision entrant Vanna performed as the interval act during the second semi-final.

Final 
The final took place on 3 March 2007, hosted by Duško Ćurlić, Mirko Fodor, Iva Šulentić and Barbara Štrbac with Nikolina Pišek and Iva Jerković hosting segments from the green room. The winner, "Vjerujem u ljubav" performed by Dragonfly featuring Dado Topić, was determined by a 50/50 combination of votes from a five-member jury panel and a public televote. In addition to the performances of the competing entries, the show was opened by 2006 Croatian Eurovision entrant Severina, while 1987 Yugoslav Eurovision entrant Novi fosili performed as the interval act.

Promotion 
Dragonfly and Dado Topić specifically promoted "Vjerujem u ljubav" as the Croatian Eurovision entry on 8 March 2007 by performing during the final of the Serbian Eurovision national final Beovizija 2007. The artists also took part in promotional activities in Bosnia and Herzegovina, Macedonia and Slovenia.

At Eurovision
According to Eurovision rules, all nations with the exceptions of the host country, the "Big Four" (France, Germany, Spain and the United Kingdom) and the ten highest placed finishers in the 2006 contest are required to qualify from the semi-final on 10 May 2007 in order to compete for the final on 12 May 2007. On 12 March 2007, a special allocation draw was held which determined the running order for the semi-final and Croatia was set to perform in position 13, following the entry from Denmark and before the entry from Poland.

Both the semi-final and the final were broadcast in Croatia on HTV 1 with commentary by Duško Ćurlić. The Croatian spokesperson, who announced the Croatian votes during the final, was Barbara Kolar.

Semi-final 

Dragonfly and Dado Topić took part in technical rehearsals on 3 and 5 May, followed by dress rehearsals on 11 and 12 May. The Croatian performance featured the members of Dragonfly and Dado Topić dressed in black. The stage lighting was dark with the LED screens displaying amber and red colours against a black background. Dragonfly and Topić were joined on stage by a backing vocalist: Anita Mlinarić.

At the end of the show, Croatia was not announced among the top 10 entries in the semi-final and therefore failed to qualify to compete in the final. This marked the first time that Croatia failed to qualify to the final of the Eurovision Song Contest from a semi-final since the introduction of semi-finals in 2004. It was later revealed that Croatia placed sixteenth in the semi-final, receiving a total of 54 points.

Voting 
Below is a breakdown of points awarded to Croatia and awarded by Croatia in the semi-final and grand final of the contest. The nation awarded its 12 points to Serbia in the semi-final and the final of the contest.

Points awarded to Croatia

Points awarded by Croatia

References

External links
DORA 2007 official website

2007
Countries in the Eurovision Song Contest 2007
Eurovision